Dinesh Chandra Bhandary (4 August 1934 – 20 January 2021) was a Group Captain in the Indian Air Force who was awarded the Vir Chakra, The third highest military decoration in India for the services rendered by him during the Indo-Pakistani War of 1971. He originally hailed from an aristocratic Bunt family of Kolnadu Pademane of Mulki, India.

References

1934 births
2021 deaths
Indian Air Force personnel
Recipients of the Vir Chakra